Rear-Admiral George Edward Richards (1852–1927) was a British naval officer and hydrographer. He commanded the survey ship HMQS Paluma which in the late 19th century surveyed the Great Barrier Reef in Queensland, Australia.
Richards served aboard the schooner  in 1878, and HMQS Paluma in 1887. He was commanding officer of  surveying the Strait of Belle Isle in 1897.

Early life
He was the eldest son of Sir George Richards, Hydrographer of the Royal Navy.

On 5 January 1879 he married Emily Rose, the youngest daughter of John de Courcey Bremer, of Rose Bay, Sydney.

Naval career

He was a sub-lieutenant aboard HMS Wolverine (2,431 tons) when it reached Brisbane in August 1877.

While in command of Renard (1878–84) he surveyed the Russell Islands, Rendova Island, part of New Georgia and Pocklington Reef. He also surveyed the Duke of York Islands. The Indispensable Reefs and Bampton Reefs were also visited.

He later commanded HMS Alacrity (1881–82) on hydrographic voyages along the coast of Queensland north of Hinchinbrook Island.

The 1887 voyage named the following places:
Cid Harbour 1887
Orpheus Island 1887
Pioneer Bay
Acacia Island
Mausoleum Island
Combe Island
Paluma Rock in the Palm Islands

Captain Richards was placed on the retired list, at his own request, in December 1902. He was promoted to rear-admiral on the Retired list on 1 July 1907.

He died in December 1927.

Legacy
He compiled the first volume of, Pacific Islands ... sailing directions (1885).

He was a birdwatcher and collector and a number of tropical birds are named after him.

References 

Australian hydrographers
Royal Navy officers
English ornithologists
English hydrographers